George Gilby is an English reality television personality from Essex, known primarily for appearing in the Channel 4 series Gogglebox. In 2014, he took part in the fourteenth series of Celebrity Big Brother where he reached the final.

Career
In September 2013, George made his first appearance in the Channel 4 reality series Gogglebox debuting in the second series along with his mother, Linda and now late father, Peter. The family were axed from the show in 2014 following George's decision to participate in the fourteenth series of Celebrity Big Brother, where he entered on 18 August 2014 and reached the final on 12 September finishing fourth overall.

In February 2016, George and his family returned to Gogglebox. In 2018, George left the show, however, his parents Linda and Pete continued on the programme without him until 2020.

On 28 June 2021, it was announced that George’s father, Pete Mcgarry who starred alongside him and his mother, Linda, in Gogglebox, had died aged 71, from a short illness. His death was not COVID-19 related.

Personal life
On 15 June 2016, George and girlfriend Gemma Conway welcomed their first child, Amelie.

Filmography

References

Year of birth missing (living people)
Living people
Participants in British reality television series